Governor Spaulding may refer to:

Huntley N. Spaulding (1869–1955), 61st Governor of New Hampshire
Rolland H. Spaulding (1873–1942), 55th Governor of New Hampshire